Futatsuishi Dam  is a rockfill dam located in Miyagi Prefecture in Japan. The dam is used for irrigation. The catchment area of the dam is 19 km2. The dam impounds about 52  ha of land when full and can store 10600 thousand cubic meters of water. The construction of the dam was started on 1988 and completed in 2009.

See also
List of dams in Japan

References

Dams in Miyagi Prefecture